Lanzenbach may refer to:

 Lanzenbach (Bühler), a river of Baden-Württemberg, Germany, tributary of the Bühler
 Lanzenbach (Speltach), a river of Baden-Württemberg, Germany, tributary of the Speltach
 Lanzenbach (Weißach), a river of Bavaria, Germany, tributary of the Weißach